The Tahiti women's national sevens rugby union team is Tahiti's national representative in Rugby sevens. Tahiti competes in the Pacific Games since the introduction of women's rugby sevens in the 2011 Pacific Games in New Caledonia.

Current squad
Squad to 2015 Pacific Games:
Remini Nawei
Teuira Hanaley
Tokoragi Raitiare Tihan
Huchede Eva
Frogier Vainui
Hurahutia Maruiata
Cloe Devaluez 
Herenui Tehuiotoa
Mooria Toimata
Teriinohopuaiterai Meihiti
Anais Heimata Temarii
Florine Tevero

Previous Squads

Pacific Games

2011
Tahiti played six games in the preliminary rounds, losing four and drawing twice with Cook Islands and Guam. They finished in 7th place overall.

Preliminary Round
 0 - 27 
 5 - 42 
 12 – 12 
 12 – 12 
 5 - 33 
 0 - 43 
Knockout stage

Playoff for 6th place game
 0 - 27

2015
At the 2015 Pacific Games Tahiti lost all of their matches and finished in last place.

See also

Rugby union in Tahiti

References

Women's national rugby sevens teams
Rugby union in French Polynesia
Rugby union in Tahiti
R